Constantin Traian Ștefan (born 8 January 1951) is a Romanian former footballer who played as a goalkeeper.

Club career
Constantin Ștefan was born on 3 January 1951 in Brașov, Romania. He started his career at age 14 at the junior squads of Universitatea Cluj, a team for which he made his Divizia A debut on 23 September 1968 when coach Constantin Teașcă sent him on the field in the 88th minute in order to replace Cristian Ringheanu in a 3–0 victory against Argeș Pitești and won the national title at junior level in 1969. After 6 seasons in which he played 85 Divizia A matches for "U" Cluj, helping the club finish 3rd in the 1971–72 Divizia A, also appearing in two games against Levski Sofia in the 1972–73 UEFA Cup, he was transferred to Dinamo București. In his first season spent with The Red Dogs, he won the Divizia A title under coach Nicolae Dumitru, making only 2 appearances as the team's first choice for the goalkeeper position was Mircea Constantinescu, but won another title in the 1976–77 season, this time making 31 appearances under coach Ion Nunweiller. Ștefan played a total of 101 
Divizia A appearances in his 6 seasons spent at Dinamo and played 7 games in European competitions, including a clean sheet in a 1–0 victory against Real Madrid in the 1975–76 European Cup. Constantin Ștefan ended his career by playing three seasons in Divizia B, one at Rapid București and the last two at Dinamo Victoria București, afterwards working as a mathematics teacher.

International career
Constantin Ștefan played one game for Romania under coach Ștefan Kovács in a 1–0 defeat against East Germany on Stadion der Weltjugend from Berlin.

Honours
Dinamo București
Divizia A: 1974–75, 1976–77

References

1951 births
Living people
Romanian footballers
Romania international footballers
Association football goalkeepers
Liga I players
Liga II players
FC Universitatea Cluj players
FC Dinamo București players
FC Rapid București players
Victoria București players
Sportspeople from Brașov